Prince of the South is the second album by Atlanta rapper Lil Scrappy, released on May 13, 2008. The album features guest appearances by down-south-based rappers Lil' Flip and J-Bo of YoungBloodZ.

Track listing

Charts

External links 
 
 Prince of the South (album) at Real Talk Ent.

Lil Scrappy albums
2008 albums
Real Talk Entertainment albums
Albums produced by Big Hollis